Unpakt is a comparative pricing and booking website for moving services. Headquartered in New York City, Unpakt launched in July 2012, offering online planning, price comparisons and booking of moving companies.

Company history
Unpakt was founded in November 2010 by Ben-Harosh.

Unpakt was recognized as a PC Magazine Top 100 Website of 2013.

References 

Moving and relocation
Moving companies of the United States
Transport companies established in 2010
Internet properties established in 2012
Companies based in New York City